Adolphe Hug (23 September 1923 – 24 September 2006) was a Swiss football goalkeeper who played for Switzerland in the 1950 FIFA World Cup. He also played for Urania Genève Sport and FC Locarno.

References

External links
FIFA profile

1923 births
Swiss men's footballers
Switzerland international footballers
Association football goalkeepers
Urania Genève Sport players
FC Locarno players
1950 FIFA World Cup players
2006 deaths
Footballers from Zürich